Mice Shilegov (born 19 June 1998) is a Macedonian handball player who plays for RK Metalurg Skopje.

He participated at the 2017 Men's Junior World Handball Championship.

References

1998 births
Living people
Macedonian male handball players
Sportspeople from Skopje